Kingfish: A Story of Huey P. Long is a 1995 television drama starring John Goodman and directed by Thomas Schlamme.  The film originally aired on TNT and was nominated for two Emmy awards.

Plot
This is a biographical drama about Louisiana politician Huey Long, whose nickname was The Kingfish. He served as the 40th governor of Louisiana from 1928 to 1932 and as a member of the United States Senate from 1932 until his assassination in 1935. As the political leader of Louisiana, he commanded wide networks of supporters and was willing to take forceful action. He established the long-term political prominence of the Long family.

Cast
 John Goodman as Huey Long
 Matt Craven as Seymour Weiss
 Anne Heche as Aileen Dumont
 Ann Dowd as Rose Long
 Bob Gunton as Franklin D. Roosevelt
 Bill Cobbs as Pullman Porter
 Hoyt Axton as Huey P. Long, Sr.
 Kirk Baltz as Frank Costello
 Richard Bradford as Judge Benjamin Pavy
 Jimmie Ray Weeks as Allen Henderson

References

External links

TV Guide

1995 films
1995 drama films
1995 television films
1990s biographical drama films
1990s historical drama films
American biographical drama films
American historical drama films
American political drama films
Biographical television films
American drama television films
Drama films based on actual events
Films about American politicians
Films set in Louisiana
Films set in the 1910s
Films set in the 1920s
Historical television films
Huey Long
Cultural depictions of Franklin D. Roosevelt
Cultural depictions of Frank Costello
Films directed by Thomas Schlamme
1990s English-language films
1990s American films